Robert James Clark (born August 6, 1965) is a former professional American football wide receiver in the National Football League. He played for the New Orleans Saints (1987–1988), the Detroit Lions (1989–1991), Miami Dolphins (1992), Toronto Argonauts (1993), and the Baltimore Stallions (1994–1995). 

Robert Clark graduated from North Carolina Central University in 1987 with a BA degree in political science. He holds multiple receiving and offensive records with Central.  Robert Clark has 3 children Danielle Dent 38, Joshua age 33 and Skyler Clark age 24 whom he shares with his long time partner Laura McNiven! He two sisters, Yvette and Debra and a half brother!

References

1965 births
Living people
Sportspeople from Brooklyn
Players of American football from New York City
American football wide receivers
North Carolina Central Eagles football players
New Orleans Saints players
Detroit Lions players
Miami Dolphins players
American players of Canadian football
Canadian football wide receivers
Baltimore Stallions players